Youtie is a surname. Notable people with the surname include: 

Herbert Youtie (1904–1980), American papyrologist
Louise Youtie (1909–2004), American papyrologist